The Power Makers is a 1957 Australian short directed by Lee Robinson, about brown coal coal mining in Australia and the Yallourn Power Station.

It won the 1959 AFI Award for Best Documentary.

References

External links

1950s short documentary films
1957 films
1957 documentary films
Films directed by Lee Robinson
Coal mines in Victoria (Australia)
Documentary films about fossil fuels
Australian short documentary films
1950s English-language films